Diqo (also, Digo) is a village in the Astara Rayon of Azerbaijan.  The village forms part of the municipality of Şəvqo.

References 

Populated places in Astara District